Cannaregio is the northernmost of the six historic sestieri (districts) of Venice. It is the second largest sestiere by land area and the largest by population, with 13,169 people .

Isola di San Michele, the historic cemetery island, is associated with the district.

History 
The Cannaregio Canal, which was the main route into the city until the construction of a railway link to the mainland, gave the district its name (Canal Regio is Italian for Royal Canal). Development began in the eleventh century as the area was drained and parallel canals were dredged. Although elegant palazzos were built facing the Grand Canal, the area grew primarily with working class housing and manufacturing. Beginning in 1516, Jews were restricted to living in the Venetian Ghetto. It was enclosed by guarded gates and no one was allowed to leave from sunset to dawn. However, Jews held successful positions in the city such as merchants, physicians, money lenders, and other trades. Restrictions on daily Jewish life continued for more than 270 years, until Napoleon Bonaparte conquered the Venetian Republic in 1797. He removed the gates and gave all residents the freedom to live where they chose.

In the 19th century, civil engineers built a street named Strada Nuova through Cannaregio, and a railway bridge and road bridge were constructed to connect Venice directly to Mestre. Today, the areas of the district along the Grand Canal from the train station to the Rialto Bridge are packed with tourists, but the rest of Cannaregio is residential and relatively peaceful, with morning markets, neighborhood shops, and small cafés.

Main sights 
 Venetian Ghetto
 Venezia Santa Lucia railway station
 Ponte delle Guglie
 Ponte dei Tre Archi
 Palazzo Bollani Erizzo
 Palazzo Bonfadini Vivante
 Palazzo Calbo Crotta
 Palazzo Contarini Pisani
 Palazzo Correr Contarini Zorzi
 Palazzo Giustinian Pesaro
 Palazzo Falier
 Palazzo Labia
 Palazzo Mastelli del Cammello
 Palazzo Memmo Martinengo Mandelli
 Palazzo Michiel del Brusà
 Palazzo Nani
 Palazzo Savorgnan
 Palazzo Surian Bellotto
 Palazzo Smith Mangilli Valmarana
 Palazzo Testa
 Isola di San Michele
 Ca' Vendramin Calergi
 Ca' d'Oro
 Sacca della Misericordia

Churches 

See: List of Churches in Cannaregio
 Santa Maria di Nazareth, known as Chiesa degli Scalzi
 Santa Maria dei Miracoli
 Sant'Alvise
 San Giovanni Crisostomo
 San Geremia
 San Canciano
 Madonna dell'Orto
 Abbazia della Misericordia

See also 
 Sestieri of Venice

References

External links 
 
 Photos of Cannaregio: canals, shops, markets -- Visit Venice

 
Sestieri of Venice